The Shadow Lawn Historic District	is a historic district in central Austin, Texas that has a cohesive collection houses built in the southeast portion of Hyde Park during the late 1920s and 1930s.

Roughly bounded by 38th Street, 39th Street, Avenue G, and Duval Street, the district includes several homes of historic interest from the turn of the twentieth century, including the Col. Monroe M. Shipe House, Hildreth-Flanagan-Heierman House, Frank M. and Annie G. Covert House, Page-Gilbert House, Smith-Marcuse-Lowry House, and the Oliphant-Walker House. This subdivision was platted by Hyde Park founder Monroe M. Shipe and indicated by concrete markers, some of which still stand today. Shipe's own home is located at the corner of 39th Street and Avenue G. The district was added to the National Register of Historic Places in 1990.

Shadow Lawn's historical significance stems from the architecture of its houses. The district features a number of dwellings with modest Tudor Revival detailing characteristic of historicist "cottage" bungalows built in the 1930s. The dominance of this architectural form is an important feature that distinguishes the district from nearby housing clusters, as no other area in the northern suburbs of Austin contains as high a concentration of Tudor Revival dwellings. Unlike the bungalows in the nearby Hyde Park Historic District, these houses utilized more expensive masonry veneer rather than cheaper wood siding.

Education
Residents are served by the Austin Independent School District. Residents are assigned to Lee Elementary School, Kealing Middle School, and McCallum High School.

See also
Hyde Park Historic District (Austin, Texas)

References

Historic districts on the National Register of Historic Places in Texas
National Register of Historic Places in Austin, Texas
Streetcar suburbs
Tudor Revival architecture in Texas
Houses on the National Register of Historic Places in Texas